Suraya Mosque is a mosque located in Torreón, Coahuila, Mexico. The mosque was completed in 1989 and was the first purpose-built mosque constructed in Mexico. Most of its attendees belong to the Shia branch of Islam.

History 
The region around Torreón has had a Middle Eastern immigrant presence since the early 20th century. However, it wasn't until 1983 that approximately 35 people, descendants of first generation immigrants, founded the first Islamic meeting house in Mexico. The meeting house was led by Hassan Zain Chamut.

One of the attendants, Elias Serhan Selim, proposed the meeting house have a dedicated place of worship built for the community. He sponsored the project and sought the expertise of architect Zain Chamut in order to design a mosque that reflected both Islamic and Hispanic architectural tradition. Construction of a mosque began in 1986 and was completed in 1989.

See also
 Islam in Mexico
 List of mosques in the Americas

References 

1989 establishments in Mexico
Arab Mexican
Buildings and structures in Coahuila
Middle Eastern diaspora in North America
Mosques in Mexico